Hilltop is a ghost town in Mercer County, Kentucky, United States.

References

Geography of Mercer County, Kentucky
Ghost towns in Kentucky